Southside Central (Ward 8) is one of the 23 wards of Glasgow City Council. On its creation in 2007 and in 2012 it returned four council members, using the single transferable vote system. For the 2017 Glasgow City Council election, the boundaries were changed, the ward population decreased but it continued to return four members.

Boundaries
The ward is located immediately south of Glasgow city centre, with the River Clyde forming its northern boundary. Areas within the ward include the Gorbals, Hutchesontown, Govanhill, Queen's Park, Crosshill and Oatlands. The 2017 changes saw the Toryglen area being re-assigned to Langside ward.

The ethnic makeup of the smaller Southside Central ward using the 2011 census population statistics was:

74.6% White Scottish / British / Irish / Other
20.2% Asian (Mainly Pakistani)
3.4% Black (Mainly African)
1.8% Mixed / Other Ethnic Group

Councillors

Election results

2022 election
2022 Glasgow City Council election

2017 election
2017 Glasgow City Council election

2012 election
2012 Glasgow City Council election

2007 election
2007 Glasgow City Council election

See also
Wards of Glasgow

References

External links
Listed Buildings in Southside Central Ward, Glasgow City at British Listed Buildings

Wards of Glasgow
Gorbals
Govanhill and Crosshill